Meadowbrook station is a light rail station in South Salt Lake, Utah, served by the Blue Line and the Red Line of Utah Transit Authority's TRAX light rail system. The Blue Line provides service from Downtown Salt Lake City to Draper. The Red Line provides service from the University of Utah to the Daybreak community of South Jordan.

Description 
The station is located at 188 West 3900 South and is easily accessed from West Temple and westbound 3900 South; however, vehicles traveling east on 3900 South must access the station by turning north onto West Temple (as left turns into the station from 3900 South are not permitted.  Just west of the station (and the tracks) is the small Meadowbrook Campus of Salt Lake Community College. About a block north of the station is a large townhouse development. The station has a free Park and Ride lot with nearly 500 free parking spaces available. The station opened on 4 December 1999 as part of the first operating segment of the TRAX system and is operated by the Utah Transit Authority.

References 

TRAX (light rail) stations
Railway stations in Salt Lake County, Utah
Railway stations in the United States opened in 1999
1999 establishments in Utah